The 2011 Tuvalu A-Division (also known as the 2011 National Provident Fund Championship League) is the 11th season of top flight association football in Tuvalu. The season began on 29 January 2011 and ended on 12 March 2011. Nauti FC were the defending champions.

Football in Tuvalu is played at club and national team level. The Tuvalu national football team draws from players in the Tuvalu A-Division; the national team competes in the Pacific Games and South Pacific Games. The national team is controlled by the Tuvalu National Football Association (TNFA).

Club information

Regular Stage

Table

Round 1
These matches took place from the weekend of 29 January 2011.

Round 2
These matches took place from the weekend of 5 February 2011.

Round 3
These matches took place from the weekend of 12 February 2011.

Round 4
These matches took place from the weekend of 19 February 2011.

Round 5
These matches took place from the weekend of 26 February 2011.

Round 6
These matches took place from the weekend of 5 March 2011.

Round 7
These matches took place from the weekend of 12 March 2011.

Top goalscorers

External links 
tnfa.tv
vriendenvantuvalu.nl

Tuvalu A-Division seasons
Tuvalu
football